During World War II, Operation Alpine Violet was a proposed German operation designed to help the Italians in 1941 break out of their Albanian colony and into Greece. This operation was never executed.

In October 1940, the Italians invaded Greece without German help and were quickly driven back by the Greeks into retreat and into Albania.  An Italian "Spring Offensive" in March 1941 made little progress and proved very costly for the few gains made.

In April 1941, the Germans launched Operation Marita and the Italians in Albania were ultimately able to take advantage of German attacks elsewhere.  By mid-April, the Greek forces in Albania were withdrawing.  On 22 April, the 4th Bersaglieri Regiment crossed back into Greece.

See also
 Italian invasion of Albania
 Military history of Albania during World War II
 Greco-Italian War
 Battle of Greece

Greco-Italian War
Alpenveilchen
Cancelled military operations of World War II
Cancelled military operations involving Germany